The Pakistani Instrument of Surrender was a written agreement between India, Pakistan, and the Provisional Government of Bangladesh that enabled the capitulation of 93,000 West Pakistani POWs, including 15,000 civilians, of the Armed Forces Eastern Command on 16 December 1971, thereby ending the Bangladesh Liberation War and the Indo-Pakistani War of 1971 with the formal establishment of the People's Republic of Bangladesh in erstwhile East Pakistan. It was the largest surrender in terms of number of personnel since the end of World War II.

The event, known as Victory Day, is celebrated as a national holiday in Bangladesh; it is also celebrated by the Indian Armed Forces.

Surrender ceremony

The surrender ceremony took place at the Ramna Race Course in Dacca, East Pakistan (now Bangladesh), on 16 December 1971: A. A. K. Niazi of the Pakistan Army formally surrendered to Jagjit Singh Aurora, an Indian Army officer and joint commander of the Bangladesh Forces. A. K. Khandker, Deputy Chief of Staff of the Bangladesh Forces, represented the Provisional Government of Bangladesh at the ceremony.

Also present from the Pakistani Eastern Command were Mohammad Shariff of the Pakistan Navy and Patrick Desmond Callaghan of the Pakistan Air Force, both of whom signed the agreement alongside Niazi. Sagat Singh, Commander of the Indian IV Corps; Hari Chand Dewan, Commander of the Indian Eastern Air Command; and J. F. R. Jacob, Chief of Staff of the Indian Eastern Command; all acted as witnesses on behalf of India.

Niazi accepted the surrender while the crowd on the race course promptly erupted in celebrations.

Text of the Instrument

The document is now public property under the governments of India, Bangladesh, and Pakistan, and can be seen on display at the National Museum in the Indian capital of New Delhi. The text of the Instrument of Surrender is as follows:

Sources
  "Instrument of Surrender of Pakistani forces in Dacca", Hosted by Ministry of External Affairs, India
 "The Separation of East Pakistan"

References

Bangladesh Liberation War
Bangladeshi documents
Indian documents
Government documents of Pakistan
Peace treaties of Bangladesh
Peace treaties of Pakistan
India–Pakistan military relations
1971 in Bangladesh
1971 in India
1971 in Pakistan
Peace treaties of India
Treaties concluded in 1971
Treaties entered into force in 1971
Surrenders
India–Pakistan treaties
December 1971 events in Asia